Safety Town is a program for children that teaches safety lessons about fire, pedestrians/traffic, water, guns, and poisons/drugs. It is also the name given to a replica town created to instruct children about safety measures.

The Safety Town program was founded by Officer Frend Boals in Mansfield, Ohio in 1937 after a child was struck and killed by a car on his way to school. The "National Safety Town Center" was founded in 1964 by Dorothy Chlad in Cleveland, Ohio.

References

External links
National Safety Town Center
safetytownproducts.com 

Child safety
Road safety in the United States
Road safety campaigns
1937 establishments in Ohio